Staffarda Abbey (Abbazia Santa Maria di Staffarda) is a Cistercian monastery  located near Saluzzo in north-west Italy; it was founded as a daughter house of Tiglieto Abbey in 1135 by Manfred I, Marquis of Saluzzo. The abbey became an important local centre for agriculture and held a flourishing market. It was placed in commendam to the Order of Saints Maurice and Lazarus in 1750.

A portrait of Cesare Alessandro Scaglia di Verrua, abbot of Staffarda, painted by Antony van Dyck in about 1634, is now in the National Gallery in London.

An important musical manuscript, the Codex Staffarda, dating to the 1480s or 1490s and containing reference to the commandatory abbot Brixianus Taparelli, is now in the National University Library of Turin. It includes polyphonic works by Renaissance composers such as Jacob Obrecht and Antoine Brumel, as well as the earliest surviving example of a polyphonic Dies Irae by an otherwise unknown composer, Engarandus Juvenis.

References

http://www.piemontefeel.org/EN/Page/t01/view_html?idp=43
https://archive.today/20030311025010/http://www.mauriziano.it/arte/monumenti/staffard/storia.htm
https://web.archive.org/web/20070503182652/http://www.piemonte-emozioni.it/cultura/eng/edifici_religiosi/edifici_culto/staffarda.shtml
https://web.archive.org/web/20060511175517/http://www.ingranda.it/castelli/pagine/Staffarda.asp
https://web.archive.org/web/20070928181327/http://www.comune.revello.cn.it/staffarda.htm?a5
https://web.archive.org/web/20110718084550/http://www.cistercensi.info/abbazie/abbazie.asp?ab=1081&lin=en

External links

www.cistercensi.info: Photographs of the abbey complex
More photos

 http://www.freewebs.com/pinocarita/staffardaabbey.htm

Monasteries in Piedmont
1135 establishments in Europe
12th-century establishments in Italy
Religious organizations established in the 1130s
Cistercian monasteries in Italy
Christian monasteries established in the 12th century